Conrad Janis (February 11, 1928 – March 1, 2022) was a jazz trombonist and actor who starred in film and television during the Golden Age Era in the 1950's and 1960's, and continued acting right up until 2012. He played the role of Mindy McConnell's father, Frederick, in 53 episodes of Mork & Mindy, and appeared in many guest-starring roles on several notable television shows throughout the 1970's, 1980's, and 1990's such as sitcoms like Maude, The Golden Girls, and Frasier.

Early life
Janis was born in Manhattan on February 11, 1928.  His father, Sidney, was an art dealer and writer; his mother, Harriet (Grossman), was also a writer.  He had one brother, Carroll.  Janis successfully auditioned for a road company at the age of 13 and consequently spent the next two years with them.  He also began doing radio voice work during this time.

Career

Film and television 
Janis secured a role in the play Dark of the Moon during its pre-Broadway run, in which he was spotted by a Hollywood talent scout.  He stayed with the production when it ran in New York City, consequently making his Broadway debut in March 1945.  He then made his film debut later that year as Ronald Stevens in the film Snafu.  He then played Johnikins in Margie (1946) with Jeanne Crain.  He starred in the film noir The Brasher Doubloon with George Montgomery the following year.

Janis's work on television included starring in "Fit to Kill" on The Web on November 19, 1950.  He played eldest son Edward on the sitcom Bonino in 1953.  He subsequently appeared in an episode of Get Smart as a KAOS agent; guest-starred as a dance marathon emcee on The Golden Girls; and appeared in the sci-fi sitcoms Quark and Mork and Mindy.  He also featured in The Buddy Holly Story and the Goldie Hawn / George Segal comedy The Duchess and the Dirtwater Fox.  Janis made a brief appearance as himself in the jazz bar scene from Nothing in Common.

Music 
Janis was a longtime advocate of traditional jazz.  He assembled a band of jazz musicians in 1949 ("all of the guys that I idolized"), consisting of James P. Johnson (piano), Henry Goodwin (trumpet), Edmond Hall (clarinet), Pops Foster (bass), and Baby Dodds (drums), with himself on trombone.  During the late 1970s, he formed the Beverly Hills Unlisted Jazz Band, which appeared multiple times on the Tonight Show Starring Johnny Carson and gave eight sold-out performances at Carnegie Hall.

Personal life
Janis's first marriage was to Vicki Quarles.  Together, they had two children: Christopher and Carin.  They later divorced.  His second marriage to Ronda Copland also ended in divorce.  Janis married his third wife, Maria Grimm, in 1987.  They remained married until her death in September 2021.

Janis died aged 94 on March 1, 2022, in Los Angeles. His death was announced by his business manager Dean A. Avedon, who was also the executor of his estate.

Filmography

References

External links
 

 
 Interview with Conrad Janis – The Spectrum, November 2015.
Conrad Janis Interview NAMM Oral History Library (2018)

1928 births
2022 deaths
20th-century American male actors
20th-century American male musicians
20th-century American musicians
20th-century trombonists
21st-century American Jews
21st-century American male actors
21st-century American male musicians
21st-century American musicians
21st-century trombonists
American male film actors
American male jazz musicians
American male stage actors
American male television actors
American trombonists
Male actors from New York City
Male trombonists
Jazz musicians from New York (state)
Jewish American male actors
Jubilee Records artists
Musicians from New York City